Jesse Sanders (born June 5, 1989) is an American former professional basketball player. Sanders is known for his decorated college career for Liberty University, where he was the first NCAA Division I player to record a triple-double in each of his four varsity seasons.

College career
At Liberty, Sanders was a four-year starter at point guard.  For his career, he scored 1,235 points (9.7 per game).  He also graduated as the school's all-time assist leader with 726.  In 2011, Sanders was named the Big South Conference Player of the Year and an honorable mention All-American by the Associated Press.  In the 2011–12 season, his 8.0 assists per game was the third-highest mark in the nation.

Professional career

Jesi (2012–2013) 
In June 2012, Sanders signed with Fileni BPA Jesi of Italy for the 2012–13 season. In 25 games, he averaged 9.7 points, 5.5 rebounds, 2.1 assists and 1.4 steals per game in his first professional season.

Sydney Kings (2013–2014) 
On June 8, 2013, Sanders signed with the Sydney Kings for the 2013–14 NBL season. On November 14, 2013, Sanders was informed that the November 15 game against the Townsville Crocodiles would be his last, after the Kings signed former NBA veteran Sam Young.

On February 23, 2014, the Kings announced that Sanders would be returning to the club following import Charles Carmouche's decision to return the United States. On March 16, 2014, Sanders recorded a near triple-double with 24 points, 10 rebounds and 8 assists in a crucial 100-90 win over the Adelaide 36ers.

In 13 games for the Kings (over his two stints), Sanders averaged 10.5 points, 4.7 rebounds and 3.5 assists per game.

Limburg United (2014–2015) 
On August 24, 2014, Sanders signed with Limburg United of Belgium for the 2014–15 season.

Tübingen (2015–2016) 

On May 22, 2015, Sanders signed with Tigers Tübingen of Germany.

Göttingen (2016–2017) 
On June 21, 2016, Sanders signed with BG Göttingen for the 2016–17 season.

Benfica (2017–2018) 
On August 21, 2017, Sanders signed with S.L. Benfica for the 2017–18 season.

Personal
Sanders is the son of Tom and Nancy Sanders. He is one of six children: two older brothers, Thomas and Ethan, a younger brother, John, and two sisters. He also has a wife named Courtney.

As a child, Sanders and his brother, Thomas, started a small business called Sanders Bros Landscaping.

References

External links

RealGM profile

1989 births
Living people
American expatriate basketball people in Australia
American expatriate basketball people in Belgium
American expatriate basketball people in Germany
American expatriate basketball people in Italy
American expatriate basketball people in Portugal
American men's basketball players
Basketball players from Texas
BG Göttingen players
Liberty Flames basketball players
Limburg United players
People from Sugar Land, Texas
Point guards
S.L. Benfica basketball players
Sportspeople from the Houston metropolitan area
Sydney Kings players
Tigers Tübingen players